Practical Horseman is an American equestrian magazine that focuses on English-style riding, most notably hunter/jumpers as well as dressage and eventing.

History and profile
The magazine was founded in 1973 with the name The Pennsylvania Horse. It was formerly published by Cowles Magazines and part of Cowles Enthusiast Titles. In 1998 Primedia bought the company and also, the magazine. The magazine was published by the Equine Network, a subsidiary of Source Interlink, until 2010 when it was acquired by Active Interest Media. In 2021, Active Interest Media sold its Equine Network properties to Growth Catalyst Partners. Practical Horseman was formerly headquartered in Unionville, Pennsylvania. Its headquarters is in Gaithersburg, Maryland.

Known as the "English rider's #1 resource," the magazine has monthly articles on training, riding, turnout of the horse, equine medical issues, profiles of riders, and reviews and results of national and international competitions. The website of the magazine was launched in 2008.

Staff
Editor: Sandra Oliynyk
Assistant Editor: Emily Daily
Assistant Editor: Jocelyn Pierce
Art Director: Philip S. Cooper

References

External links
Official website

Monthly magazines published in the United States
Sports magazines published in the United States
Equine magazines
Magazines established in 1973
Magazines published in Maryland
Magazines published in Pennsylvania